Adenoncos is a genus of the orchid family (Orchidaceae), consisting of 20 species native to Thailand, Vietnam, Malaysia, Indonesia and New Guinea.

References 

Vandeae genera
Aeridinae
Taxa named by Carl Ludwig Blume